Aloe rauhii (common name snowflake aloe) is a rare succulent and highly drought-resistant plant endemic to Madagascar.  It is named after Professor Werner Rauh, who was a professor of Botany at the University of Heidelberg in Germany.

Description  
Aloe rauhii are less than 6 inches (15 cm) high.  Leaf rosettes are approximately 5 inches (12 cm) in diameter.  The leaves have characteristic heavily white oval spots with tiny white marginal teeth, the overall appearance of which may resemble snowflakes. Plant propagates via clumping. In full sunlight, the green and white leaves become a purplish orange color.

Conservation status
Madagascar is recognized as one of the most ecologically rich countries in the world, and over 80% of its flora is endemic.  However, the diverse plant life is under threat and some species are on the verge of extinction.  The flora of Madagascar is unique due to the island's separation from the African continent over 160 million years ago, a possible explanation for A. rauhii being an endemic species.

References

rauhii
Plants described in 1963
Endemic flora of Madagascar